Bagh-e Hajji (also Romanized as Bāgh-e Ḩājjī and Bāgh Ḩājī) is a village in Qaleh Asgar Rural District, Lalehzar District, Bardsir County, Kerman Province, Iran. At the 2006 census, its population was 203, in 47 families.

References 

Populated places in Bardsir County